The Oslo Synagogue is a synagogue in Oslo, Norway. The congregation was established in 1892, but the present building was erected in 1920.  Architectural historian Carol Herselle Krinsky  describes the two-story tall, stuccoed building with a round tower topped with a spire supporting a Star of David as resembling  "a simple and charming country chapel.'

King Harald V and Crown Prince Haakon visited the synagogue in June, 2009.

History

2006 shooting attack
The synagogue was the site of a 2006 shooting attack, suspected by police to have been perpetrated by four men in a car. No one was injured. The four allegedly were the 29-year-old criminal-turned-Islamist Arfan Bhatti of Pakistani origin, a 28-year-old Norwegian-Pakistani, a 28-year-old Norwegian of foreign origin, and a 26-year-old Norwegian.

Bhatti was acquitted for terror charges, but still convicted for co-conspiracy to the shooting (along with several other unrelated charges) which was instead judged as "coarse vandalism". The three other men were acquitted of all charges.

Interfaith peace ring
On 21 February 2015, around 1,000 people formed a human "ring of peace" outside the synagogue on Shabbat, to show that they deplore antisemitic violence. The event, which was initiated by a group of young Norwegian Muslims, occurred shortly after a string of terrorist attacks across Europe, including in the Île-de-France attacks in Paris and the Copenhagen shootings. According to organizer Hajrah Arshad, the intent of the ring was to show "that Islam is about love and unity." Zeeshan Abdullah, a co-organizer, stated that "We want to demonstrate that Jews and Muslims do not hate each other...We do not want individuals to define what Islam is for the rest of us...There are many more peace-mongers than warmongers." The crowd of Muslims, Jews, and others held hands in unity as Norway's Chief Rabbi Michael Melchior sang "Eliyahu Hanavi", the traditional song after Havdalah. The demonstration received international media attention. Some media reports stated that possibly only a minority of those present were Muslims. Ervin Kohn, the president of the Norwegian Jewish community, told enquiring reporters that the exact number of Muslims among those present at the demonstration was impossible to quantify.

See also
 Trondheim Synagogue
 Jewish Museum in Oslo
 History of the Jews in Norway
 The Holocaust in Norway

References

External links
 Det Mosaiske Trossamfund

1920 establishments in Norway
21st-century attacks on synagogues and Jewish communal organizations
Antisemitism in Norway
Ashkenazi Jewish culture in Europe
Ashkenazi synagogues
Islam and antisemitism
Islamic terrorism and Norway
Jews and Judaism in Oslo
Orthodox Judaism in Europe
Orthodox synagogues
Religious buildings and structures in Oslo
Religious organizations established in 1892
Synagogues completed in 1920
Synagogues in Norway